Dobromir Mitov (born 3 April 1972) is a retired Bulgarian football defender and currently coach and interim manager of CSKA Sofia.

Honours

Club
CSKA Sofia
 A Group: 1996–97
 Bulgarian Cup: 1996–97

References

1972 births
Living people
Bulgarian footballers
First Professional Football League (Bulgaria) players
OFC Pirin Blagoevgrad players
Botev Plovdiv players
PFC CSKA Sofia players
FC Lokomotiv 1929 Sofia players
PFC Lokomotiv Plovdiv players
PFC Rilski Sportist Samokov players
PFC Pirin Blagoevgrad players
PFC Marek Dupnitsa players
Association football defenders
Bulgaria international footballers
Sportspeople from Blagoevgrad